Barry Wood may refer to:
Barry Wood (bishop) (1942–2017), South African Roman Catholic bishop
Barry Wood (cricketer) (born 1942), English former cricketer
Barry Wood (singer) (1909–1970), American singer and television producer
Barry Wood (American football) (1910–1971), American football player and medical educator
Barry Wood (interior designer), model, American television host, and interior decorator
Barry Wood (rugby league) (born 1950), Australian rugby league footballer